The domestic canary, often simply known as the canary (Serinus canaria forma domestica), is a domesticated form of the wild canary, a small songbird in the finch family originating from the Macaronesian Islands (the Azores, Madeira and the Canary Islands).

Canaries were first bred in captivity in the 17th century, having been brought to Europe by Spanish sailors. This bird became expensive and fashionable to breed in courts of Spanish and English kings. Monks started breeding them and only sold the males (which sing). This kept the birds in short supply and drove the price up.  Eventually, Italians obtained hens and were able to breed the birds. This made them very popular, resulting in many breeds arising, and the birds being bred all over Europe.

The same occurred in England. First the birds were only owned by the rich, but eventually the local citizens started to breed them and, again, they became very popular. Many breeds arose through selective breeding, and they are still very popular today for their voices.

From the 18th up to the 20th centuries, canaries and finches were used in the UK, Canada and the US in the coal mining industry to detect carbon monoxide. In the UK, this practice ceased in 1986.

Typically, the domestic canary is kept as a popular cage and aviary bird. Given proper housing and care, a canary's lifespan ranges from 10 to 15 years.

Etymology
The birds are named after Spain's Canary Islands, which derive their name from the Latin Insula Canaria (after one of the larger islands, Gran Canaria), meaning "island of dogs", due to its "vast multitudes of dogs of very large size".

Varieties
Domestic canaries are generally divided into three main groups:
Colour-bred canaries (bred for their many colour mutations – Ino, Eumo, Satinette, Bronze, Ivory, Onyx, Mosaic, Brown, red factor, Green (Wild Type): darkest black and brown melanin shade in yellow ground birds, Yellow Melanin: mutation showing yellow ground color with brown and black pigment, Yellow Lipochrome: mutation creating the loss of brown and black pigment, leaving yellow ground color etc.)
Type canaries (bred for their shape and conformation – Australian plainhead, Berner, Border, Fife, Gibber Italicus, Gloster, Lancashire, Raza Española, Yorkshire, etc.)
Song canaries (bred for their unique and specific song patterns – Spanish Timbrado, German Roller (also known as Harz Roller), Waterslager (also known as "Malinois"), American Singer, Russian Singer, Persian Singer).

While wild canaries are a yellowish-green colour, domestic canaries have been selectively bred for a wide variety of colours, such as yellow, orange, brown, black, white, and red (the colour red was introduced to the domestic canary through hybridisation with the red siskin (Spinus cucullatus), a species of South American finch). Evidence of hybridization has also been found between the domestic canary (S. canaria domestica) and the black-chinned siskin (Spinus barbatus) in captivity.

Competitions
Canaries are judged in competitions following the annual molt in the summer. This means that in the Northern Hemisphere the show season generally begins in October or November and runs through December or January. Birds can only be shown by the persons who raised them. A show bird must have a unique band on its leg indicating the year of birth, the band number, and the club to which the breeder belongs. 

There are many canary shows all over the world. The world show (C.O.M. - Confederation Ornithologique Mondiale) is held in Europe each year and attracts thousands of breeders. As many as 20,000 birds are brought together for this competition.

Miner's canary

Mice were used as sentinel species for use in detecting carbon monoxide in British coal mining from around 1896, after the idea had been suggested in 1895 by John Scott Haldane. Toxic gases such as carbon monoxide or asphyxiant gases such as methane in the mine would affect small warm-blooded animals before affecting the miners, since their respiratory exchange is more rapid than in humans. A mouse will be affected by carbon monoxide within a few minutes, while a human will have an interval of 20 times as long. Later, canaries were found to be more sensitive and a more effective indicator as they showed more visible signs of distress. Their use in mining is documented from around 1900. The birds were sometimes kept in carriers which had small oxygen bottles attached to revive the birds. The use of miners' canaries in British mines was phased out in 1986.

The phrase "canary in a coal mine" is frequently used to refer to a person or thing which serves as an early warning of a coming crisis. By analogy, the term "climate canary" is used to refer to a species (called an indicator species) that is affected by an environmental danger prior to other species, thus serving as an early warning system for the other species with regard to the danger.

Use in research
Canaries have been extensively used in research to study neurogenesis, or the birth of new neurons in the adult brain, and also for basic research in order to understand how songbirds encode and produce song. Thus, canaries have served as model species for discovering how the vertebrate brain learns, consolidates memories, and recalls coordinated motor movements.

Fernando Nottebohm, a professor at the Rockefeller University in New York City, detailed the avian brain structures and pathways that are involved in the production of bird song.

Canaries are sometimes used to avoid hazardous human testing. Wasicky et al 1949 used them in early testing of insect repellents. Human testing could only provide limited sample size and the inherent variance of the host ⇔ repellent ⇔ insect interaction is too high. Canaries, among other test animals, provided larger sample sizes cheaply.

In culture
In organized crime, the canary symbolizes an informant who "sings to the police".

Canaries have been depicted in cartoons from the mid-20th century as being harassed by domestic cats; the most famous cartoon canary is Warner Bros.' "Tweety". Big Bird from Sesame Street is also a canary. This also includes Chuck, a mischievous and very fast bird from Angry Birds.

Norwich City, an English football team, is nicknamed "the Canaries" due to the city once being a famous centre for breeding and export of the birds. The club adopted the colours of yellow and green in homage. Jacob Mackley, of Norwich, won many prizes with birds of the local variety and shipped about 10,000 from Norwich to New York every year. A number of other sports teams worldwide use variations of the name "Canaries", such as Atlético Morelia (Mexico), Frosinone (Italy), Koper (Slovenia), FC Novi Sad (Serbia), Fenerbahçe (Turkey), Lillestrøm SK (Norway), Kedah FA (Malaysia), IAPE (Maranhão, Brazil), the Brazil national football team and the Brazil women's national football team.

See also
 Atlantic canary (wild canary)
 Australian plainhead
 Harz Roller
 Red factor canary
 Birdcage
 John Scott Haldane
 Warrant canary
 Sentinel species

References

Further reading
 McDonald, Robirda, Brats in Feathers, Keeping Canaries 
 Miley-Russell, Marie, The Practical Canary Handbook, A Guide to Breeding and Keeping Canaries. . Especially useful to American Singer canary owners.
 Linda Hogan, Canary Tales
 GB Walker, Colour, Type, and Song Canaries
 David Alderton, Birds Care, You and your pet bird
 Author unknown, The Canary Handbook, Canaries, Barrons
 Tim Hawcroft, Health Care for Birds
 James Blake, Fife Canaries

External links
 The Canary FAQ
 The Rockefeller University
 

Birds described in 1758
Taxa named by Carl Linnaeus
Canary
Serinus
Warning systems

bg:Канарче